Suryodaya TV (सुर्योदय) is a television channel based in Birtamod.It was established in 2016.It broadcasts Local Programmes, News and Music. It also broadcasts a Talk Show.

Television channels and stations established in 2016
Television channels in Nepal
2016 establishments in Nepal